Lew Shaver is a former American football and basketball coach.  He served as the head football coach at Southwest Minnesota State University from 1977 to 1978, compiling a record of 3–16.

References

External links
 Southwest Minnesota State wheelchair basketball profile

Year of birth missing (living people)
Living people
Southwest Minnesota State Mustangs football coaches